C.J. Saunders (born September 15, 1996) is an American football wide receiver for the Carolina Panthers of the National Football League (NFL). He played college football at Ohio State.

College career
Saunders was unranked by 247Sports.com coming out of high school. He committed to Ohio State as a walk-on before the 2015 season. After getting the opportunity to play sporadically for the team, he applied for and was denied a sixth year of eligibility.

Professional career
After spending a year as a graduate assistant at Ohio State, Saunders had a mini-camp tryout with the Atlanta Falcons in May 2021. On June 1, 2021, Saunders signed with the Carolina Panthers. He was waived on August 31, 2021, and re-signed to the practice squad the next day. He signed a reserve/future contract with the Panthers on January 10, 2022.

On August 30, 2022, Saunders was waived by the Panthers and re-signed to the practice squad. He signed a reserve/future contract on January 9, 2023.

Coaching career
Saunders coached as a graduate assistant at Ohio State in 2020 after he was denied a sixthyear of eligibility.

References

External links
Ohio State Buckeyes bio
Carolina Panthers bio

1996 births
Living people
People from Dublin, Ohio
Players of American football from Ohio
American football wide receivers
Ohio State Buckeyes football players
Ohio State Buckeyes football coaches
Carolina Panthers players